Cyrtoclymeniina was an extinct suborder of ammonites that existed during the Devonian.

References

 
Clymeniida
Devonian ammonites
Late Devonian first appearances
Late Devonian animals
Famennian extinctions